Thomas Nairne (died c. April 17, 1715) was a Scots trader and the first Indian agent of the Province of Carolina. He is best known for recording Native American customs and practices in the 1690s and 1700s, and for articulating visions and policies that guided colonial policy toward Indians.  Apparently a settler in the failed Scottish colony of Stuarts Town (near present-day Port Royal, South Carolina), he traveled widely throughout the southeast, ranging as far as the Mississippi River, and served in the Carolina provincial assembly. He was tortured to death by Yamasee in April 1715 during the Yamasee War.

Early life   
The early life of Thomas Nairne is for the most part unknown. It is known that before he was one of the Indian agents for the Province of Carolina, he had arrived in South Carolina from Scotland in 1695. In that same year, he married his wife Elizabeth Quintyne, a widow and mother of four children. In 1698, they had a son together named Thomas.

Political works   
After arriving in South Carolina, Thomas Nairne quickly found a political role. In 1707 Nairne became a representative of the House of Commons Assembly for the Colleton County. As a member of the House of Commons Assembly, he was a key member in the group organized to oppose the current Governor, Nathaniel Johnson. The group's objective was to draft new laws such as changing the Indian trade with the goal to remove the governor from being involved in the Indian trade. In the early 1700s, the House of Commons created the office of Indian agents through the Board of Indian Commissioners act.

Indian agent   
Thomas Nairne is known for being the first Indian agent for South Carolina. As an Indian agent his job was to manage and supervise the delicate cross culture trading between the colonists and the Indians, and resolve any issues that may arise between them. Thomas Nairne didn't just work to maintain peace with the tribes, but also to create and bolster allegiances between the Carolinian colonists and the Indian tribes in an effort to counter the influence of other European colonists. As an Indian agent some of Thomas Nairnes feats including arresting the Governor's son on charges of enslaving friendly Indians and illegally stealing deerskins, this wound up to backfire though as Governor Johnson charged Nairne with treason and he was forced to return to England to defend his actions. He also played the role of strategist as an Indian Agent going out to Indian Tribes to build alliances and strengthen their hold on the land. His most well known exploit happened during the conflicts between English and French colonists, when Nairne devised a plan to put pressure or seduce the Indians who had allied with the French, and use the Creek Indians to come down upon the French from the Tallapoosa River with a fleet of 80 canoes with 500 Indians coming by canoe, and another 1000 coming by land. In Nairnes memorial he claimed that he "ventured my life and made peace with the Choctas" (Moore, 1985, p. 52) and had amassed an army which stood willing to do his bidding. Ultimately the plan never made it to fruition as the French counteracted swiftly to bring the Choctaws and Chickasaws loyalties back to them. Neither the French nor the English were able to amass an Indian army against the other power and they continued to maintain their respective allies through the end of the Queen Annes War.

Death 
Thomas Nairne's death came at the hand of the Yamasee Indians during his second tenure as an Indian agent. Thomas Nairne and another fellow Indian agent, John Wright, were dispatched to smooth over any lingering issues with the Yamasee. On April 14 they had a feast with the Yamasee and ensured them that any grievances would be redressed. After the feast the agents went to bed satisfied that all issues had been resolved and there would be no more problems. Awaking on April 15, which was good Friday, they heard the sound of their cavalry. The night before the Yamasee Indians decided there would be no peace and that their grievances would only be settled by bloodshed. At dawn the Indians were riding in killing any all Europeans without discrimination. Nairne was met with a stake at the center of the village. He was tortured for three days by the Yamasee before ultimately passing away on April 17, 1715.

Notes

References
 
 
 Covington, J. W. (n.d.). SOME OBSERVATIONS CONCERNING THE FLORIDA-CAROLINA INDIAN SLAVE TRADE. Retrieved from https://palmm.digital.flvc.org/islandora/object/islandora:1761/datastream/OBJ/view/Some_Observations_Concerning_the_Florida-Carolina_Indian_Slave_Trade.pdf
 Morris, M. P. (2016, June 8). Nairne, Thomas. Retrieved February 21, 2020, from http://www.scencyclopedia.org/sce/entries/nairne-thomas/
 ExecutedToday.com. (2015, April 15). Retrieved April 6, 2020, from http://www.executedtoday.com/2015/04/15/1715-thomas-nairne-charles-town-indian-agent/

Year of birth unknown
1715 deaths
Kingdom of Scotland emigrants to the Thirteen Colonies
South Carolina colonial people
Colonial American Indian agents